Crywank is a British anti-folk band based out of Manchester, England. The band is a duo consisting of vocalist/guitarist and founder Jay Clayton and drummer Dan Watson, who joined in 2012. Allmusic describes their body of work as containing "sadness, paranoia, misery, and dry humor", comparing them to AJJ or 'a sarcastic Bright Eyes'. The group have independently released eight full length albums. They have previously toured the UK, Ireland, Mainland Europe, Russia, South East Asia, South America, Australia, New Zealand, USA, Mexico and Canada.

History

After early demos were distributed online, Crywank's debut album James Is Going to Die Soon was released in September 2010. Second album Narcissist on the Verge of a Nervous Breakdown followed in April 2012.

Clayton enlisted drummer Dan Watson to turn Crywank into a band for their third full length, Tomorrow Is Nearly Yesterday and Everyday Is Stupid which was self-released in 2013. 

Crywank released the tongue-in-cheek Shameless Valentines Money Grab EP in time for the holiday in 2014. A few weeks later, Clayton also released a Simpsons-inspired EP, Following the Lizard Queen, from the perspective (and under the name) of Langdon Alger, a minor character from the show.

Bassist Tom Connolly joined the band in 2015 until 2016 for their European tour with Jordaan Mason and the band's fourth LP and first studio album entitled Don't Piss on Me, I'm Already Dead which was released in 2016. According to Crywank the title was inspired by a Simpsons quote. In late 2016 Crywank did a co-headline U.K. tour with the Tuts. 

In 2017 Crywank worked with Vancouver record label File Under:Music and their One Song at a Time series to produce a music video for their song Part 2.

The band's fifth LP Egg on face. Foot in mouth. Wriggling Wriggling Wriggling. was released in December 2017.

The sixth LP entitled Wearing Beige On A Grey Day was released in March 2019.

In April 2019 Crywank was one of the headliners at that year’s Manchester Punk Festival and Hobart’s HOBOFOPO Festival.  

Crywank announced in 2019 that they were intending to break up after a world tour in the summer of 2020. However, due to the COVID-19 pandemic, the tour was cut short before they could tour round the USA (which they would co-headline with the band Chastity) . 

On May 1st 2020, Crywank released their seventh album entitled Fist Me 'Til Your Hand Comes Out My Mouth. It is the only one of their albums to include drummer Dan Watson on lead vocals for various tracks on the album, and the band describes it as "probably [their] weirdest [album]". The album contains themes of "the importance of self-reflection and also of silliness", "how the band has affected [their] friendship / how [their] friendship has affected the band", and reflection upon the impact of their work.

On August 28th 2021, despite previously announcing that Fist Me 'Til Your Hand Comes Out My Mouth would be their final album, Crywank announced their eighth studio album Just Popping In to Say Hi would be released on September 13th of that same year, after Clayton was involved in a housefire earlier that month.

In March 2022 Crywank ended their hiatus and continued their postponed farewell world tour, doing shows around Canada with COMMUTED, Guard Petal and Jordaan Mason.  In August 2022 Crywank and Chastity fulfilled their postponed two month Co- headline tour of the USA.

Band members
Current members
Jay Clayton – vocals, guitar, dulcimer, piano (2009–present)
Daniel Watson – drums, percussion, electronics, vocals (2013–present)

Past members
 Tom Connolly – bass, guitar, backing vocals (2015-2016)

Discography

Albums
James is Going to Die Soon – Self release, MP3 (2010) and Mount Seldom Records, Cassette, CD, MP3 (2018)
Narcissist on the Verge of a Nervous Breakdown – Self release, MP3 (2012) and Mount Seldom Records, Cassette, CD, MP3 (2018)
Tomorrow is Nearly Yesterday and Everyday is Stupid – Self release, MP3 (2013) and Mutant League Records, 12" LP, CD, Cassette, MP3 (2015)
Don't Piss on Me, I'm Already Dead – Self release, MP3, CD (2016)
Egg on Face. Foot in Mouth. Wriggling Wriggling Wriggling. – Self release, MP3 (2017) and Mount Seldom Records, Cassette, MP3 (2018)
Wearing Beige on a Grey Day – Self release, MP3, Cassette (2019)
Fist Me 'Til Your Hand Comes Out My Mouth – Self release, MP3, 12" 2xLP (2020)
Just Popping In to Say Hi – Self release, MP3 (2021)

Extended plays
On the Road to a Very Bad Place – Self release, MP3 (2010)
United By Hate (Split with the Anarchist Pizza Society) – Self release, MP3 (2012)
Shameless Valentines Money Grab – Self release, MP3 (2014)
I Will Freeze Time and Shit In Your Mouth (Split with Nyla) – Self release, CD (2016)
Shameless Money Grab – Self release, MP3 (2018)
I'll Have Some In A Bit – Self release, MP3 (2019)
Sneck in the Nose – Bagdaddy Records, 7" (2019)

Compilations
Embarrassing Early Recordings – Self release, MP3 (2014)
The First Two – Folk Punk Archive, MP3, CD (2020)
Here You Go, You Do It: A Crywank Covers Compilation – Self release, MP3 (2022)

Demos
Demo 2010 – Self release, MP3 (2010)
James is Going To Die Soon Demos – Self release, MP3 (2010)
Tour Demos 2013 – Self release, MP3 (2013)

Live albums
Live at JT SOAR - Self release, MP3, 2020

References 

English musical duos
Musical groups from Manchester
Folk punk groups
Anti-folk groups
Musical groups established in 2009
Folk music duos
Non-binary musicians